The Air Lane Trio was a musical group active in the 1940s and 1950s.  Popular over several years as a nightclub act, the group achieved minor chart success in 1947 with their recording of My Guitar Is My Sweetheart on the DeLuxe label.  This recording's top chart position was #23.  This song featured vocals by Ted Martin.

History
The group was organized sometime around late 1942, and was led by guitarist Tony Alessi, also known as Tony Lane.  Described as a "cocktail combo", in addition to guitar the group featured Arlo Hultz on organ and Ralph Pierce (real name Ralph Principe) on accordion or piano.  Despite being recently formed, the trio obtained a booking at the Dixie Hotel, and soon appeared on the Mutual Radio Network.  In their first year, they also appeared at Park Lane in Buffalo and Jack Dempsey's in New York.  They regularly appeared on WJZ in the mid-1940s.  By 1951 they were appearing on the ABC Radio network.

Recordings
Although the group itself was instrumental, it often was paired with a featured vocalist or vocalists, such as Ted Martin or the Elm City Four.

Discography
(incomplete)

Film
The Air Lane Trio appeared in at least four "soundies" featuring burlesque girls.  At least one of these films depicted the trio as female performers instead of the actual instrumentalists.

Filmography
The Sparkle Strut (1945)
Captain Kid (1946)

References

Musical trios
Musical groups established in 1942
Abbey Records artists
1942 establishments in the United States